Abul Aish (Arabic: ابو العيش) is a village in the island of Sitra, Bahrain. The Abul Aish Park is located in the village.

Etymology
Abul Aish is an Arabic word that means "father of rice".

References

Sitra